"The Blue Side" is a song written by David Lasley and Allee Willis, and recorded by American country music artist Crystal Gayle.  It was released in May 1980 as the third single from the album Miss the Mississippi. The song reached number 8 on the Billboard Hot Country Singles & Tracks.

Critical reception
Prior to the song's official release, Billboard noted that the new single was more "slower and bluesier then her previous efforts" made for United Artists Records, piano parts resembled "Don't It Make My Brown Eyes Blue".

Chart performance

Popular culture
It was featured in the background of a barroom scene in the Paul Newman crime drama Fort Apache, The Bronx.

References

1980 singles
Crystal Gayle songs
Song recordings produced by Allen Reynolds
Songs written by Allee Willis
Songs written by David Lasley
Columbia Records singles
1980 songs